Julie Lasky is an American journalist, editor and critic best known for her writings on design and popular culture. From 2012 to 2015, she was the deputy editor of The New York Times weekly "Home and Garden" section, for which she wrote a monthly column on new design called "The Details." Prior to that, she was editor of Change Observer, a Rockefeller Foundation-funded channel of the critically acclaimed website Design Observer that focused on design and social innovation. From 2002 to 2009, she was editor-in-chief of I.D., the magazine of international product design. From 1998 to 2001, she edited Interiors magazine. She began her journalism career at Print, the graphic arts bimonthly.

Publications 
 Steve Heller and Julie Lasky, Borrowed Design: Use and Abuse of Historical Form, Wiley, 1993.  
 Julie Lasky, Some People Can't Surf: The Graphic Design of Art Chantry, Chronicle Books, 2001. .

References

External links 
 Change Observer channel on Design Observer website.
 Laura Collins-Hughes, Editor Interview: Julie Lasky, Change Observer on the National Arts Journalism Program website.

Design writers
The New York Times visual journalists
American art critics
1960 births
Living people
American women journalists
American women critics
21st-century American women